This page shows a list of power stations in Argentina.

Thermal Plant

Gas Turbines

Hydroelectric 

Hydroelectric stations over 1 MW.

Nuclear

Wind

Solar

Biomass

Biogas

See also 

Electricity sector in Argentina
List of power stations in South America
List of largest power stations in the world

References 

Argentina
 
Power stations